Heim is a former municipality in the old Sør-Trøndelag county in Norway. The  municipality existed from 1911 until its dissolution in 1964. The municipality encompassed the northern part of what is now Heim and Orkland municipalities and the southeastern part of Hitra municipality in Trøndelag county. The administrative centre was the village of Heim where Heim Church is located.

History
Originally (since 1838) the municipality was a part of the municipality of Hemne (see formannskapsdistrikt law). On 1 January 1911, the large municipality of Hemne was divided into two:  Hemne (population: 3,425) in the south and Heim (population: 1,533) in the north. During the 1960s, there were many municipal mergers across Norway due to the work of the Schei Committee. On 1 January 1964, Heim ceased to exist as a municipality. The district of Vestre Heim (Western Heim, the area west of the Hemnefjord) with its 711 inhabitants was merged with the neighboring municipalities of Hemne and Vinje to form a new, larger Hemne municipality. At the same time, the district of Austre Heim (Eastern Heim, the area east of the Hemnfjorden) with its 724 residents was merged with the neighboring municipality of Snillfjord and part of the municipality of Agdenes to become a new, larger municipality of Snillfjord.

Name
The municipality is named after the old Heim farm since the first Heim Church was built there. The name comes from the word  which means "home", "homestead", or "farm".

Government
While it existed, this municipality was responsible for primary education (through 10th grade), outpatient health services, senior citizen services, unemployment, social services, zoning, economic development, and municipal roads. During its existence, this municipality was governed by a municipal council of elected representatives, which in turn elected a mayor.

Municipal council
The municipal council  of Heim was made up of 13 representatives that were elected to four year terms. The party breakdown of the final municipal council was as follows:

Mayors
The mayors of Heim:

 1911–1913: Johan Andersen Havnebugt (V)
 1914–1916: John Johnsen Vaagan, Jr. (V)
 1917–1919: Johan Edvardsen Vaagan (V)
 1920–1922: John Johnsen Vaagan, Jr. (V)
 1923–1925: Johan Edvardsen Vaagan (V)
 1926–1928: John Johnsen Vaagan, Jr. (V)
 1929–1945: Axel Aas (Ap)
 1945-1945: Lars Belsvik 
 1946-1946: Axel Aas (Ap)
 1946–1947: Kolbjørn Johansen Vaagan (Bp)
 1947-1947: Axel Aas (Ap)
 1948–1951: Kolbjørn Johansen Vaagan (Bp)
 1952–1959: John Langø (Ap)
 1960–1963: Olaf Stamnes (Sp)

See also
List of former municipalities of Norway

References

Former municipalities of Norway
Orkland
Heim, Norway
Hitra
1911 establishments in Norway
1964 disestablishments in Norway